Wizard Cup may refer to:

 Australian Football League pre-season competition, formerly the Wizard Cup
 Queensland Cup, a rugby league football competition formerly known as the Queensland Wizard Cup